Little Mongeham is a small hamlet near Dover in Kent, southeast England. The main buildings are Little Mongeham House and Manor Farm. The population of the hamlet is included in the civil parish of Sutton. Little Mongeham was until the early twentieth century a parish in its own right, including Studdal and Maidensole, and with its own rector, though the church has long since been in ruins, the foundations can still be found just to the southwest of the double bend in Willow Road through the village. The scholar Richard James held the living of Little Mongeham from 1629.

The White Cliffs Country Trail runs through the middle of the village. Other paths strike out to neighbouring villages: to Sutton, East Studdal, Northbourne and Ripple.

References

External links

Villages in Kent
Dover District